The 1829 Delaware gubernatorial election was held on October 6, 1829. Incumbent Federalist Governor Charles Polk Jr. was barred from seeking re-election to a second consecutive term. David Hazzard, the two-time Democratic-Republican nominee for Governor, ran as the National Republican, or Anti-Jacksonian, candidate as the First Party System crumbled and new political parties were formed. He was opposed by Allan Thompson, the Jacksonian candidate. Hazzard ended up winning the governorship on his third try, narrowly beating out Thompson.

General election

Results

References

Bibliography
 
 
 

1829
Delaware
Gubernatorial